Barnet may refer to:

People
Barnet (surname)
Barnet (given name)

Places

United Kingdom
Chipping Barnet or High Barnet, commonly known as Barnet, one of three focal towns of the borough below.
East Barnet, a district of the borough below; ancient parish.
New Barnet, a district of the borough below.
Friern Barnet, a district of the borough below.

Administrative units
London Borough of Barnet, in Greater London, England
Barnet (UK Parliament constituency) (1945–1974)
Chipping Barnet (UK Parliament constituency) (since 1974)

Historic units
Barnet Urban District (1863–1965) in Hertfordshire
East Barnet Urban District neighbour with same status/lifetime as above
Barnet Rural District, former name (1894–1941) of Elstree Rural District

United States
Barnet, Vermont, United States, a New England town
Barnet (CDP), Vermont, village in the town
Barnet Run, a stream in West Virginia, United States

Canada
Barnet, British Columbia, Canada, a settlement now part of the city of Burnaby

Other uses
Battle of Barnet, in the Wars of the Roses in 15th century England 
Barnet F.C., a football club in London 
Barnet, Danish title of the 1940 Danish film The Child
"Barnet", rhyming slang for "hair" (from "Barnet Fair")

See also
Barnett (disambiguation) 
Barnett, a given name and surname